Charlie-Gibbs Fracture Zone is a system of two parallel fracture zones. It is the most prominent interruption of the Mid-Atlantic Ridge between the Azores and Iceland. It can be traced over more than 2000 kilometers, all the way from north-east of Newfoundland to south-west of Ireland. It took 90 million years for the fault to grow to this length.

Structure
The transform fault of the southern fracture zone displaces the Mid-Atlantic Ridge, coming from the Azores Triple Junction, to the west over a distance of 120 km. At longitude 31.75W a south to north seismically active rift valley with a length of 40 km connects the western end of the southern transform to the eastern end of the northern transform. The northern transform fault displaces the spreading ridge over another 230 km to the west before it connects to the northern part of the Mid-Atlantic Ridge going to Iceland. Thus the total offset of the system is 350 kilometers.

Both transform faults continue eastward and westward as inactive fracture zones.

Exploration
In 1963 the existence of a transform fault near latitude 53N was first postulated on the basis of earthquake epicenter data by Bruce Heezen and Maurice Ewing. Also the study of ocean currents indicated that there should be a deep passage through the Mid-Atlantic Ridge. In July 1968  conducted a more extended survey. It was proposed that the fracture zone be renamed Gibbs Fracture Zone, as fracture zones are generally named for research vessels. The proposal was accepted only in part, and currently the official name is Charlie-Gibbs Fracture Zone. Note that the double name refers to the two parallel fracture zones together. The individual fracture zones have to be referred to as Charlie-Gibbs North and South.

Seamounts
The transform area contains two named seamounts:
It is located inside the corner of the northern branch of the Mid-Atlantic Ridge and the northern transform fault. This seamount is named after the ship Minia (1866-1922) of the Anglo-American Telegraph Company. The Minia is known for recovering bodies and artifacts from the Titanic.
It is located on the northern wall of the southern transform fault east of the short spreading ridge.

Protected area
The Charlie-Gibbs Marine Protected Area is a conservation area in the Charlie-Gibbs fracture zone in North Atlantic international waters.

References

External links
 U.S. Coast Guard Cutter Spar WLB - 403 out of Bristol RI, 1966

Fracture zones
Mid-Atlantic Ridge

fr:Zone de fracture de Charlie Gibbs